A smart ring is a wearable electronics device with advanced mobile components that combine features of mobile devices with innovative features useful for mobile or handheld use. Smart rings, which are typically the size of traditional rings or larger, combine the features of a mobile device, such as the ability to make payments and mitigate access control, with popular innovative uses such as gesture control and activity tracking. Smart rings can communicate directly with smartphones or compatible devices (such as personal computers) through a variety of applications and websites. Some smart rings can operate without the need of a mobile phone, such as when interacting with back-end systems on the cloud through or performing standalone functions such as activity tracking. They typically do not have a display and operate by contextual relevance, such as by making a payment when near a payment terminal, unlocking an electronic lock when near the lock, or controlling home appliances when making gestures in the home. Some smart rings have physical or capacitive buttons to use as an activation mechanism, such as to initiate a gesture or make a phone call.

In 2013, the English firm McLear, founded by John McLear, Chris Leach, and Joe Prencipe, released the first smart ring for sale.

Use

One of the main features of the smart ring is to serve as a near-field communication device, effectively eliminating the need to carry credit cards, door keys, car keys, and potentially even ID cards or driver's licenses. Other uses include connection to a smartphone in order to notify the user of incoming calls, text, emails, and more; use as gesture-based controller, allowing the user to perform a variety of actions with a simple motion of the hand; and measure steps, distance, sleep, heart rate, and track how many calories the user consumes.

Security

Secure access control such as for company entry and exit, home access, cars, and electronic devices was the first use of smart rings. Smart rings change the status quo for secure access control by increasing ease of use, decreasing physical security flaws such as by ease of losing the device, and by adding two-factor authentication mechanisms including biometrics and key code entry.

Payments and ticketing

Smart rings can perform payments and metro ticketing similar to contactless cards, smart cards, and mobile phones. Security of the transaction is equal to or greater than contactless cards. The first smart ring to be created with contactless payments was the NFC Payment Ring, which was mass produced and unveiled at the Olympics Summer Games at Rio de Janeiro in August 2016.

Activity
Similar to smartwatches, smart rings utilise in-built sensors to provide activity and wellness tracking. For example, step and heart beat tracking, temperature and sleep tracking (through measuring heart beats and movements) and blood flow. The smart ring form factor contains enough space to contain the same components as smartwatches. However, due to size constraints, smaller components are typically used in current smart ring products in the market, such as smaller and less accurate accelerometers, and smaller batteries leading to lower battery life than smartwatches.

Communications 
Through the use of a small microphone, or bone conduction, some smart rings can allow the wearer to make phone calls while paired with a compatible mobile phone. Smart rings are also able to notify the wearer of incoming calls and messages, by means of vibrating or lighting up.

Additionally, some smart rings allow the wearer to see and feel real-time heartbeat of the 2nd smart ring wearer, where the heartbeat is displayed on the ring similarly by means of lighting up and vibrations. Such smart rings require connection to a smartphone with active data or Wi-Fi connection to allow the transfer of data between two smart rings. The idea behind such function is to advance on a premise known as vena amoris and serve as a digital alternative to classic wedding or engagement rings.

Social

Smart rings provide social feedback to users and can be used to engage in the user's environment in a way that other wearables and mobile devices do not permit. Some smart rings provide notifications (e.g. lights or vibrations) to notify the user when they receive a text message, phone call, or other notification. This enables the user to be aware of the notification without having to constantly check their smartphone.

See also
 Smartwatch
 Wearable computer
 Personal organizer
 Near-field communication
 Oura Health

References 

Mobile computers
Human–computer interaction
Ubiquitous computing
Wearable computers
Wearable devices
Rings (jewellery)